Mnemea is a genus of longhorn beetles of the subfamily Lamiinae, containing the following species:

 Mnemea javanica Breuning, 1939
 Mnemea laosensis Breuning, 1963
 Mnemea phalerata Pascoe, 1865

References

Mesosini